Xinjing is a town in Yanhe Tujia Autonomous County, Guizhou province, China. , it has two residential communities and 11 villages under its administration.

See also 
 List of township-level divisions of Guizhou

References 

Township-level divisions of Guizhou
Yanhe Tujia Autonomous County